Prince Randian (sometimes misspelled Rardion or Randion; October 12, 1871 – December 19, 1934), also nicknamed Pillow Man, The Snake Man, The Human Torso, The Human Caterpillar and a variety of other names, was a Guyanese-born American performer with tetra-amelia syndrome and a famous limbless sideshow performer of the early 1900s, best known for his ability to roll cigarettes with his lips.

He was brought to the United States by P.T. Barnum in 1889, at the age of 18, and was a popular Coney Island carnival and circus attraction for 45 years. In 1932, he was featured in the film Freaks, in which he is seen lighting up a cigarette with a match.

Personal life 
Randian (whose birth name is unknown) was born with no arms or legs in Demerara, British Guiana. He was Hindu and spoke Hindi, English, French, and German. According to a passenger manifest of SS Parima from April 14, 1917, he had lived previously at Charlotte Amalie, Saint Thomas, U.S. Virgin Islands. With his wife, known as Princess Sarah (apparently a Hindu woman, born ), he fathered 5 children. Their children included Mary Randian (born ), Richard Randian (born ), Elizabeth Randian (born ), and Wilhelmina Randian (born ). In the 1920s he was working for Krause Amusement Company and lived in Plainfield, New Jersey. He and his wife lived at 174 Water Street, Paterson, New Jersey, until his death.

Routine 
For his act, Randian wore a one-piece wool garment that fit tightly over his body, giving him the appearance of a caterpillar, snake or potato, and would move himself around the stage by wiggling his hips and shoulders. His best-known ability was rolling and lighting cigarettes using only his lips, but he was also capable of painting and writing by holding a brush or stylus with his lips and of shaving himself by securing a razor in a wooden block. He kept all of the props and materials used in his act in a wooden box that he reportedly constructed, painted and affixed a lock to by himself.

His cigarette-lighting ability was featured in the MGM film Freaks.

Death 
Randian died at 7:00 PM on December 19, 1934, aged 63, of a heart attack shortly after his last performance at Sam Wagner's 14th Street Museum in New York.

In popular culture

Prince Randian is mentioned in Tom Waits's song Lucky Day (Overture) from his album The Black Rider, about sideshow performers.

See also 
 Violetta, another limbless sideshow performer

References

External links 
 
 Video clip "Prince Randian Lights a Smoke"

1871 births
1934 deaths
Sideshow performers
Guyanese entertainers
People with tetra-amelia syndrome
American amputees
Guyanese emigrants to the United States
Guyanese people with disabilities